Stefan Kreiner (born 30 October 1973) is a former Austrian nordic combined skier who competed during the 1990s. He won a bronze in the 3 x 10 km team event at the 1992 Winter Olympics in Albertville.

External links 
 
 

Living people
Austrian male Nordic combined skiers
Olympic Nordic combined skiers of Austria
Nordic combined skiers at the 1992 Winter Olympics
Olympic bronze medalists for Austria
1973 births
Olympic medalists in Nordic combined
Medalists at the 1992 Winter Olympics